Esther Szekeres (20 February 191028 August 2005) was a Hungarian–Australian mathematician.

Biography
Esther Klein was born to Ignaz Klein in a Jewish family in Budapest, Kingdom of Hungary in 1910. As a young physics student in Budapest, Klein was a member of a group of Hungarians including Paul Erdős, George Szekeres and Pál Turán that convened over interesting mathematical problems.

In 1933, Klein proposed to the group a combinatorial problem that Erdős named as the Happy Ending problem as it led to her marriage to George Szekeres in 1937, with whom she had two children.

Following the outbreak of World War II, Esther and George Szekeres emigrated to Australia after spending several years in Hongkew, a community of refugees located in Shanghai, China. In Australia, they originally shared an apartment in Adelaide with Márta Svéd, an old school friend of Szekeres, before moving to Sydney in 1964.

In Sydney, Esther lectured at Macquarie University and was actively involved in mathematics enrichment for high-school students. In 1984, she jointly founded a weekly mathematics enrichment meeting that has since expanded into a programme of about 30 groups that continue to meet weekly and inspire high school students throughout Australia and New Zealand.

In 2004, she and George moved back to Adelaide, where, on 28 August 2005, she and her husband died within an hour of each other.

Recognition
In 1990, Macquarie gave Szekeres an honorary doctorate.
In 1993, she won the BH Neumann Award of the Australian Mathematics Trust.

References

1910 births
2005 deaths
20th-century Hungarian mathematicians
Australian mathematicians
Hungarian Jews
Academic staff of Macquarie University
Mathematicians from Budapest
Scientists from Sydney
20th-century women mathematicians
Hungarian emigrants to Australia